Subiya may refer to:
 Subiya people
 Subiya language
 Subiya, Kuwait - region in northern Kuwait